The Ngaragba Central Prison, the national prison for men is located in Bangui in Central African Republic (CAR). As of 2022, the Ngaragba prison had around 1,335 inmates; prison conditions are reported to be poor.
On November 26, 2014, hundreds of prisoners had taken over the main jail which resulted in some casualties.

See also
1979 Ngaragba Prison massacre

References

Bibliography

Prisons in the Central African Republic
Buildings and structures in Bangui